Maguindanao's 1st congressional district was one of the two congressional districts of the Philippines in the province of Maguindanao. It was represented in the House of Representatives from 1987–2022. The district stretched along the Moro Gulf coast of western Maguindanao and includes Cotabato City, an independent port city. Barira, Buldon, Datu Blah T. Sinsuat, Datu Odin Sinsuat, Kabuntalan, Matanog, Northern Kabuntalan, Parang, Sultan Kudarat, Sultan Mastura and Upi are the district's constituent municipalities. From 2006 to 2008, the district was briefly replaced by the lone district of Shariff Kabunsuan, a short-lived province that was carved out of the same area in Maguindanao and which was eventually nullified by the Supreme Court. It was last represented in the 19th Congress by Sittie Shahara Mastura of Lakas-CMD.

Representation history

Election results

2022

2019

2016

2013

2010

See also
Legislative districts of Maguindanao
Maguindanao del Norte's at-large congressional district

References

Former congressional districts of the Philippines
Congressional districts of Bangsamoro
1987 establishments in the Philippines
2022 disestablishments in the Philippines
Constituencies established in 1987
Constituencies disestablished in 2006
Constituencies established in 2008
Constituencies disestablished in 2022